Huangshi Town is a town in Putian's Licheng District on the central coast of Fujian Province, China. It had about 148,000 people during the 2010 census.

Geography
Huangshi comprises the north-central part of Putian's Licheng District, southwest of Xinghua Bay on the Taiwan Strait.

History
The territory of present-day Huangshi was largely reclaimed from tidal marshes through land reclamation efforts begun during the late Tang and continuing til the mid-Ming, a period stretching from the 9th to the 16th centuries. Huangshi proper was a market town by the time of the Ming.

Administrative divisions
Huangshi is composed of the 2 neighborhoods of Huangshi  Huángshí Jūwěihuì) and Changxi  Chángxī Jūwěihuì) and the 36 villages of Shaban  Shābǎn Cūn), Shuinan  Shuǐnán Cūn), Dengyun  Dēngyún Cūn), Jinghou  Jǐnghòu Cūn), Heping  Hépíng Cūn), Hengtang  Héngtáng Cūn), Qijing  Qījìng Cūn), Yaotai  Yáotái Cūn), Fengshan  Fèngshān Cūn), Dingzhuang  Dìngzhuāng Cūn), Shadi  Shādī Cūn), Tianma  Tiānmǎ Cūn), Huishang  Huìshàng Cūn), Huixia  Huìxià Cūn), Pingshan  Píngshān Cūn), Dounan  Dòunán Cūn), Dongshan  Dōngshān Cūn), Dongyang  Dōngyáng Cūn), Dongdai  Dōngdài Cūn), Jinshan  Jīnshān Cūn), Xucuo  Xúcuò Cūn), Dongjia  Dōngjiǎ Cūn), Zhelang  Zhēlàng Cūn), Haibian  Hǎibiān Cūn), Jiangdong  Jiāngdōng Cūn), Huadong  Huádōng Cūn), Huazhong  Huázhōng Cūn), Huadi  Huádī Cūn), Qiaodou  Qiáodōu Cūn), Xiadai  Xiàdài Cūn), Xiajiangtou  Xiàjiāngtóu Cūn), Xili  Xīlì Cūn), Xihong  Xīhóng Cūn), Qingzhong  Qīngzhōng Cūn), Qinghou  Qīnghòu Cūn), and Qingqian  Qīngqián Cūn).

Religion
The village of Qiaodou, known as Ninghai during the Song and Ming, is the site of the earliest-attested temple to the Chinese sea goddess Mazu, the deified form of the 10th-century shamaness Lin Moniang. Supposedly, Lin was born on nearby Meizhou Island, usually regarded as the cradle of her cult, but she probably spent her adult life on the mainland.

At present, Shuinan's Tianhou Palace is Huangshi's main temple. It was first constructed during the Hongwu Era of the Ming. It was rebuilt and adapted for use as Shuinan's guildhall in 1795. The town holds religious processions every year on the 15th day of the first month of the Chinese lunar calendar and during the intercalary month of each year which has one. The main temple in the Qiaodou area is its Jiucha Temple honoring the Great God of Jiucha. Its religious processions occur on the second and third days of the second lunar month.

Transportation
The S201 highway connects central Huangshi to Hanjiang to the north and Xiuyu to the south. The G15 Expressway is nearby.

References

Citations

Bibliography
 .
 .
 .

External links
 . 

Township-level divisions of Fujian
Putian